How to Destroy Angels may refer to:

How to Destroy Angels (Coil EP), a 1984 EP by Coil
How to Destroy Angels (Remixes and Re-Recordings), a 1992 album by Coil 
How to Destroy Angels (band), a band featuring Trent Reznor
How to Destroy Angels (How to Destroy Angels EP), the band's 2010 eponymous EP